Sharat Kumar (born 29 July 1937 in Meerut, India) is an Indian writer of both fiction and nonfiction.  He is best known for his novels Orange Moon (2002, English edition) and Lal Kothi Alvida ("Farewell Red Mansion") (2004, Hindi, 2009, English).

Filmography
Duvidha (2008)

References

Sources

External links

 Management article by Sharat Kumar
http://www.indianexpress.com/news/duvidha/325476/

1937 births
Living people
Hindi-language film directors
Indian male novelists
21st-century Indian novelists
Indian male screenwriters
People from Meerut
Indian Navy officers
Institute of Management Technology, Ghaziabad people
Screenwriters from Uttar Pradesh
21st-century Indian male writers
Male actors from Uttar Pradesh
Indian male film actors
20th-century Indian male actors
Novelists from Uttar Pradesh
21st-century Indian non-fiction writers
21st-century Indian screenwriters